Chris Hayes (born 11 August 1987) in County Limerick is an Irish jockey who competes in Flat racing.

Hayes began his career riding in pony racing and went to the RACE training school. He joined the stable of Kevin Prendergast as an apprentice jockey in 2004 and was Irish champion apprentice in 2005, 2006 and 2007.  In 2017 he became first jockey to Fozzie Stack, alongside his role as Prendergast's stable jockey.

Major wins
Ireland
 Flying Five Stakes - (2) -  Sole Power (2015), Romantic Proposal (2021)
 Irish 1,000 Guineas - (1) - Homeless Songs (2022) 
 Irish 2,000 Guineas - (1) - Awtaad (2016)
 Irish St. Leger - (2) - Voleuse De Cours (2013), Search For A Song (2019)
 Matron Stakes - (1) - La Collina (2013)
 Moyglare Stud Stakes - (1) -  Tahiyra (2022)

References 

1987 births
Living people
Irish jockeys
Sportspeople from County Limerick